Monza is a genus of skipper butterflies in the family Hesperiidae.

Species
Monza alberti (Holland, 1896)
Monza cretacea (Snellen, 1872)
Monza punctata (Aurivillius, 1910)

References

External links
Natural History Museum Lepidoptera genus database
Seitz, A. Die Gross-Schmetterlinge der Erde 13: Die Afrikanischen Tagfalter. Plate XIII 78 f

Erionotini
Hesperiidae genera
Taxa named by William Harry Evans